The 2009 Absa Currie Cup Premier Division season was the 71st season in the competition since it started in 1889. The competition was contested from 10 July through to 31 October.

It was won by the Blue Bulls, who defeated the Free State Cheetahs 36-24 in the final at Loftus Versfeld. The Boland Cavaliers, who finished bottom of the Premier Division, were relegated after losing their promotion-relegation playoff to the First Division Champions, the Pumas, while the Leopards, who finished second from bottom in the Premier Division, narrowly retained their place in the top division after defeating the South Western District Eagles in the other playoff.

Final standings

Updated 10 October 2009:

Points Breakdown
Four points for a win
Two points for a draw
One bonus point for a loss by seven points or less
One bonus point for scoring four or more tries in a match

Table Notes
P = Played
W = Won
D = Drawn
L = Lost
PF = points for
PA = Points Against
PD = Points Difference (PF - PA)
TF = Tries For
TA = Tries Against
BP = Bonus points
Pts = Total Points

Teams

Fixtures and results
 Fixtures are subject to change.
 All times are South African (GMT+2).

Compulsory Friendlies

Round one

Round One Summary
 The Boland Cavaliers held off the fast finishing Leopards to claim a 26-18 win in their Absa Currie Cup Premier Division match at Boland Stadium in Wellington on Friday 10 July.
 Griquas showed plenty of fight and spirit as they registered a fine 28-18 victory over the Free State Cheetahs in a thrilling Absa Currie Cup match in Bloemfontein on Friday 10 July.
 The Blue Bulls overcame a spirited Golden Lions' side to triumph 19-13 in a scrappy Absa Currie Cup match at Loftus Versfeld in Pretoria on Saturday 11 July.
 Flyhalf Willem de Waal scored 19 points to steer Western Province to a comfortable 29-15 win over defending ABSA Currie Cup champions the Sharks at Newlands on Saturday 11 July.

Standings Afters Round One

Round two

Round Two Summary
 The  dismantled a gallant Boland Cavaliers side to record a 46-10 victory in their Absa Currie Cup match at the Absa Stadium in Durban on Friday 17 July.
 The roar is back in the Golden Lions team as they mounted a spirited comeback to beat the Free State Cheetahs 31-22 at Coca-Cola Park in Johannesburg on Saturday 18 July.
 Scrum-half Sarel Pretorius scored two tries and continued to push for selection to higher honours as he steered Griquas to a 36-11 victory over the Leopards in their Absa Currie Cup match in Kimberley on Saturday 18 July.
 The Blue Bulls held off a spirited Western Province to triumph 30-22 in their Absa Currie Cup match at Loftus Versfeld in Pretoria on Saturday 18 July.

Standings Afters Round Two

Round three

Round Three Summary
 The  overcame three yellow-cards to claim a scrappy 19-13 win over the Blue Bulls in their Absa Currie Cup match at the Absa Stadium in Durban on Friday 24 July.
 Western Province consigned the Free State Cheetahs to a third consecutive Absa Currie Cup defeat with a 19-13 victory at Newlands on Friday 24 July.
 The log-leading Griquas made it three out of three in the Absa Currie Cup Premier Division with an 80-7 victory over the Boland Cavaliers in Kimberley on Saturday 25 July.
 The Xerox Lions dismantled the Leopards 40-19 in their Absa Currie Cup match at the Royal Bafokeng Sports Palace in Phokeng on Saturday 25 July.

Standings Afters Round Three

Round Four

Round Four Summary
 Griquas built up enough of a lead in the first half and then produced an inspired defensive effort in the second to beat the Xerox Lions 23-19 in their Absa Currie Cup Premier Division match in Johannesburg on Friday 31 July.
 Luke Watson scored a hat-trick of tries as Western Province made it three wins out of four in the Absa Currie Cup Premier Division with a 48-7 victory over the Leopards at Newlands in Cape Town on Friday 31 July.
 The Blue Bulls cantered to a 50-18 win over the Boland Cavaliers in their Absa Currie Cup game at Loftus Versfeld in Pretoria on Friday 31 July.
 A superb kicking performance from Rory Kockott saw  hand the Free State Cheetahs a 21-12 defeat in their Absa Currie Cup match at Vodacom Park in Bloemfontein on Friday 31 July.

Standings Afters Round Four

Round Five

Round Five Summary
 Griquas made it five wins out of five in the Currie Cup Premier Division with a nail-biting 33-32 victory over Western Province in Kimberley on Friday 7 August.
 The Golden Lions edged out the Boland Cavaliers 19-13 in their Absa Currie Cup Premier Division match at Boland Stadium in Wellington on Friday 7 August.
 Defending Absa Currie Cupchampions  moved into second place on the log with a 44-15 victory over the Leopards at the Royal Bafokeng Sports Palace in Phokeng on Friday 7 August.
 The Free State Cheetahs captured their first win of the season as they beat the Blue Bulls 24-15 in their Absa Currie Cup match at Vodacom Park in Bloemfontein on Friday 7 August.

Standings Afters Round Five

Round Six

Round Six Summary
 The Free State Cheetahs ran in 11 tries as they smashed the Leopards 71-17  in their Absa Currie Cup match at Olen Park in Potchefstroom on Friday 14 August.
 The Blue Bulls scored a try in the dying minutes of the match to beat the Griquas 25-24 in their Absa Currie Cup clash at Park in Kimberley on Saturday 15 August.
 Western Province eased to a 38-7 win over the Boland Cavaliers in their Absa Currie Cup match at Boland Stadium in Wellington on Saturday 15 August.

Standings Afters Round Six

Round Seven

Standings Afters Round Seven

Round Eight

Standings Afters Round Eight

Round Nine

Standings Afters Round Nine

Round Ten

Standings Afters Round Ten

Round Eleven

Round Twelve

Round Thirteen

Round Fourteen

Knock Out Stage

Semi finals

Final

Promotion/relegation Matches

Round 1

Round 2

The Pumas are promoted to the Premier Division while the Boland Cavaliers are relegated to the First Division. The Leopards retain their place in the Premier Division while the SWD Eagles remain in the First Division.

Monthly awards

References

External links
 Latest Currie Cup News
 

 
2009
2009 in South African rugby union
2009 rugby union tournaments for clubs